Lieutenant General Sir George Judd Harding  (1788 – 5 July 1860) was a British Army officer who became Lieutenant Governor of Jersey.

Military career
Harding was commissioned into the Royal Engineers in 1802. He took part in the Napoleonic Wars, being deployed first to Messina in 1807, and then to Gibraltar, where in 1810 he worked with Sir Charles Holloway on the demolition of two Spanish forts and the rest of the Spanish Lines of Contravallation of Gibraltar. He was the Chief Engineer on Gibraltar in about 1831.

He was appointed Lieutenant Governor of Jersey in 1856 and was also Colonel Commandant of the Corps of Royal Engineers.

In 1860 he was appointed to the Order of the Bath. He died later that year.

Legacy
On Gibraltar, he worked on a number of fortifications. There is a refurbished gun battery which is called Harding's Battery. At one point the southern tip of Gibraltar was known as Harding's Point.

References

1788 births
1860 deaths
British Army lieutenant generals
British Army personnel of the Napoleonic Wars
Knights Commander of the Order of the Bath
Royal Engineers officers